Midwest Express Airlines Flight 105 was a scheduled domestic passenger flight that crashed into an open field in Milwaukee, Wisconsin shortly after taking off from General Mitchell International Airport on September 6, 1985. The airplane, a Douglas DC-9, was carrying 31 passengers and crew. None of them survived the crash.

Multiple eyewitnesses reported that the plane was on fire shortly after it took off from the airport. The fire was caused due to a failure on the right engine where one of its removable sleeve spacers detached. The removable sleeve spacer suffered metal fatigue that caused the engine to explode.

The National Transportation Safety Board (NTSB), the investigation team who was responsible for the investigation of the crash, concluded that despite the plane suffering engine failure, it was still controllable, and instead the response of the crew to the failure was the main cause of the accident. The crew failed to properly control the plane during the emergency. Breakdown of the crew's coordination also contributed to the crash.

Aircraft
On September 6, 1985, Flight 105 was a Midwest Express Airlines flight scheduled to be operated using a Douglas DC-9-14 twin-engine, single-aisle jet airliner (registration N100ME). The DC-9 was manufactured in 1968 and delivered to Linea Aeropostal Venezolana. In 1976, it was sold to Aerovias Venezolanas, S.A., who then sold it to K-C Aviation (the owner of Midwest Express) in 1983. The aircraft had accrued a total of 31,892 operating hours and 48,903 cycles at the time of the accident.

Passengers and crew
Flight 105 departed Milwaukee carrying 27 passengers and 4 crew members. Most of the passengers were businessmen.

The two flight attendants were 24-year old Sharon Ann Herb and 21-year old Amy Marie Bain.

Instead of a captain and first officer, Flight 105 was crewed by two captains.

The first captain of the flight was 31-year old Captain Danny Watkin Martin. Captain Martin was employed by Midwest Express in 1984 as a First Officer. He was promoted as a Captain in 1985 and had accumulated a total of 4,600 flight hours, including 1,000 hours on the DC-9 (600 flight hours as a First Officer on the DC-9, and 500 hours as a captain). Before he was an employee of Midwest, he was a corporate pilot of a Beechcraft 90 King Air.

The second captain (though acting as a first officer) was 37-year old Captain William Roger Weiss. Captain Weiss was employed by Midwest Express in 1984 and later received his DC-9 type rating. At the time, he had accrued 5,197 total flight hours, including 1,640 hours on the DC-9 (500 hours as a First Officer of the DC-9 and 1,140 hours as a captain). He was a former employee of KC Aviation, the parent company of Midwest Express. Captain Weiss was also a former US Air Force pilot, flying an F-4.

Flight
Flight 105 took off at 15:20 with 27 passengers and 4 crew members. Flight 105 departed from Mitchell's Runway 19R en route to its destination of Hartsfield-Jackson Atlanta Int'l Airport, Atlanta, Georgia. Before the flight, the plane had previously been operated as Flight 206 with the same flight crew.

At 15:21, during its initial climb, at an altitude of 700 ft above the ground, the right engine exploded. Flight 105 swayed several times. Captain Martin heard the loud bang and reacted: "What the [expletive] was that?", which was not responded to by First Officer Weiss. Flight 105 was then instructed by the ATC to turn towards heading 175. At this stage, the ATC worker could see that smoke and flames were emanating from the right engine, with parts of the plane falling to the ground.

First Officer Weiss declared an emergency. The plane then climbed with a high angle of attack. Due to the high angle of attack, the air speed decreased significantly. It began to roll to the right, and then stalled and rolled abruptly to an angle of 90 degrees, barrel-rolled at least once, and crashed into an open field in a wildlife preserve just several hundred meters from runway 19R. The aircraft was completely demolished by impact forces and fire, with nearly the entire structure fragmented.

Investigation
Roughly 100 eyewitnesses stated that they saw flames and smoke from the right engine shortly after the explosion and that some parts of the plane detached and fell to the ground. They also stated that loud bangs were continuously heard during the accident. Shortly afterwards, the crew lost control of the plane and the plane crashed into the field. Investigators then constructed several possible scenarios as to what might have caused the plane to lose control.

Possible control failure due to turbine explosion
Investigators immediately examined the fragments of the engine. They stated that the explosion might have been powerful enough to propel fragments of the turbine with sufficient speed to penetrate the plane and damage the flight controls, which could explain why the plane suddenly pitched up and barrel-rolled immediately after the explosion. 5 years before the crash of Flight 105, in Poland an Ilyushin Il-62 crashed into a moat after its engine number 2 exploded and damaged the plane's elevator and aileron. Immediately after the explosion, the plane nosedived to the ground.

The explosion was caused by a detached removable sleeve spacer inside the right engine. The detachment was caused by metal fatigue. Examination of the turbine fragments and their distribution during the explosion led to the conclusion that the ejection of the fragments didn't contribute to the crash, as the velocity of the fragments was substantially absorbed and decreased by the engine cowling. The NTSB noted that several parts of the engine could not be found; they concluded that, based on their calculation and distribution of the fragments on the ground, the unidentified parts were reduced to tiny, harmless bits. The left engine did not exhibit any signs of pre-impact damage or failure

The NTSB also stated that, although the explosion caused serious damage to the engine cowling, the cowlings were all latched. None blew outwards, which would have caused a massive drag force on the plane. This, in turn, could have affected the controllability of the plane. Small portions of the cowling did blow outwards, but the NTSB concluded that these parts caused very little drag force.

The NTSB later concluded that even if any turbine parts were ejected and somehow able to penetrate the plane, the impact would be small and no controls would be affected.

Pilot error
In the initial seconds after the explosion, Flight 105 swayed to the right and left. In response, the pilot used the rudder to counteract the plane's movements. The examination concluded that the plane was easily controllable and that it could still be controlled properly without the rudder inputs. Additionally, the crew made a pitch input, raising the aircraft's nose.

The crew may have wrongly perceived the nature of the emergency. Since the explosion of the engine caused the loss of engine thrust, the speed of the plane decreased. This rapid deceleration caused the crew to think that the plane was pitching down, which may explain why the crew made a nose-up input, while in reality, it didn't pitch down. This phenomenon is known as a somatogravic illusion. However, instead of fixing the situation, the nose-up input that the crew made only caused the plane to decelerate even more. The pilot may have suffered spatial disorientation immediately after the emergency.

The NTSB noted that the plane had banked to the right to such a severe angle that the plane entered a state which investigators call an "accelerated stall".

Cockpit breakdown
During the emergency, Captain Martin called for the instrument readings to First Officer Weiss. However, Weiss didn't reply to any of his questions or remarks. Since an emergency had occurred on board the plane, First Officer Weiss should have responded and worked with Martin in order to handle the emergency properly. Weiss' failure to respond may have further confused Captain Martin.

Investigators stated that Weiss also might have been confused by the information on his instruments. They also stated that Weiss' action might have been influenced by Midwest Express' "silent cockpit" philosophy.

Midwest Express expected its pilots to adhere to an unwritten policy called the "silent cockpit", where pilots would make no unnecessary callouts or even verbalize the nature of an emergency after 100 knots and before reaching an altitude of 800 ft. The emergency on board Flight 105 that day started at roughly 700 ft above the ground, meaning that the "silent cockpit" rule was in effect at the time. Investigators stated that the pilots should have worked together immediately since an emergency that occurred at low altitude was dangerous. With the silent cockpit rule, the crew's ability to effectively work together would have been hampered. This rule conflicted with FAA regulations and therefore should have been prohibited by the FAA.

Seconds after the failure of the right engine, Captain Martin applied proper inputs to the plane. However, he was uncertain about the situation of Flight 105 at the time. Due to this, he asked First Officer Weiss for assistance. The NTSB, on their report, stated that Martin might have asked Weiss as he was far more senior and had more experience. He may have thought that Weiss was far more knowledgeable than him in identifying the nature of the emergency. Weiss didn't respond to any of Martin's remarks and questions. Based on the evidence from the CVR, investigators believe that Weiss actually heard Martin's questions and remarks but ignored them for some reason. He was not incapacitated, as evidence from the recordings indicated that he communicated with Milwaukee Tower while Martin was asking him about the information of the plane's instruments.

Captain Martin held primary responsibility for handling the emergency and taking corrective actions. However, the emergency should have been handled by both men working together as a team. Weiss should have assisted the Captain in responding and diagnosing the problem that had occurred on board Flight 105. The NTSB stated:

"The redundancy provided by the First Officer is one of the basic tenets of Cockpit Resource Management."

The NTSB then concluded that breakdown in crew coordination was one of the main causes of the accident, one possible cause being their inexperience--only a few hundred hours in this jet.

Inadequate FAA oversight
The lack of experience of an FAA Principal Operations Inspector (POI) may have caused the silent cockpit philosophy to be approved by the FAA without proper examination.  The philosophy was contrary to the approved practice by the FAA. If she had had more experience, she might have recognized that the concept had flaws, and that the airline was already teaching the concept to their employees.

The NTSB believed that the POI who worked with Midwest Express did not perform her duties at an adequate level. As per the final report:

"The safety board believes that the FAA oversight of Midwest Express procedures and training during certification and ongoing day-to-day activity in the carrier's first 2 years of operation was less than optimum and probably suffered as a direct result of the inexperience of the POI. The POI testified that she devoted only 20 percent of her worktime to Midwest Express, her only FAR 121 scheduled passenger airline, and that she was still obligated to perform routine general aviation rules. The Board noted that the POI had no previous FAR 121 air carrier experience, that she was not rated in a turbojet of the category and class used by the airline, and that she had not rated received any formal training in the DC-9 airplane used by the certificate holder for which she was responsible. In fact, she had no turbojet pilot experience. Neither did the POI have available for consultation or assistance air carrier inspectors assigned to other offices to fulfill her responsibilities. Apparently, she had become so dependent on other inspectors in surveilling Midwest Express that her own role was reduced primarily to administrative matters. The absence of first-hand knowledge of the carrier and her lack of experience in turbojet air carrier operations severely handicapped her ability to perform the quality of surveillance required to detect shortcomings of FAR 121 airline operation. The Safety Board believes that the experience level of the POI was inappropriate for her assignment as the POI of a new air carrier operating turbojet equipment. She even testified that she was not totally comfortable with the arrangement."

See also 
 Aviation accidents and incidents
 Aviation safety
 List of accidents and incidents involving commercial aircraft
China Airlines Flight 006, a 747 that nearly impacted the Pacific Ocean after an improper pilot response and pilot errors made after the failure of the #4 engine.

References

External links 

Airliner accidents and incidents in Wisconsin
Airliner accidents and incidents caused by pilot error
Aviation accidents and incidents in the United States in 1985
Accidents and incidents involving the McDonnell Douglas DC-9
105
1985 in Wisconsin
Disasters in Wisconsin
History of Milwaukee
September 1985 events in the United States
Airliner accidents and incidents involving uncontained engine failure